The Pamphylian Spring Minnow (Pseudophoxinus alii) is a species of freshwater fish in the family Cyprinidae. It is found in Ilica and Körmürcüler streams as well as the Karaöz section of Aksu River in Turkey.

References

Pseudophoxinus
Endemic fauna of Turkey
Fish described in 2007